Arthur Dean may refer to:

 Arthur Dean (Australian politician) (born 1943), Australian Liberal politician
 Arthur Dean (UK politician) (1857–1929), British Conservative Party politician, MP 1924–1929
 Arthur Dean (cricketer) (born 1931), Australian cricketer
 Arthur Dean (judge) (1893–1970), Australian judge
 Arthur Dean (lawyer) (1898–1987), American corporate lawyer and advisor to numerous U.S. presidents
 Paul Dean, Baron Dean of Harptree (Arthur Paul Dean, 1924–2009), British Conservative Party politician

See also
 Arthur Deane Nesbitt (1910–1978), Canadian businessman
 Dean (surname)